Lookout Point Dam is an earth-type dam on the Middle Fork Willamette River in the U.S. state of Oregon. It is located in Lane County. Its reservoir is called Lookout Point Lake. The dam's primary purpose is flood control, with secondary purposes of power generation, recreation, and irrigation. Lookout Point Dam was completed in 1954 and is located 360.3 km upstream of the Pacific Ocean

See also
 List of dams in the Columbia River watershed
 List of lakes in Oregon

References

Dams in Oregon
Hydroelectric power plants in Oregon
Buildings and structures in Lane County, Oregon
United States Army Corps of Engineers dams
Dams completed in 1953
1953 establishments in Oregon